North Bungunya is a rural locality in the Goondiwindi Region, Queensland, Australia. In the  North Bungunya had a population of 39 people.

Geography 
The land use is a mix of grazing on native vegetation and crop growing. The northern part of the locality is mostly grazing and the crop growing is mostly in the south of the locality.

History 
The locality was officially named and bounded on 26 November 1999.

In the  North Bungunya had a population of 39 people.

Economy

There are a number of homesteads in the locality:
 Aurifer Downs
 Cairngorm
 Foxborough
 Llidem Vale
 Ranchall
 Three Valleys
 Walton Downs
 Wonga Downs

Transport
There are a number of airstrips, including:

 Wycanna airstrip

 Sherwood airstrip

References 

Goondiwindi Region
Localities in Queensland